Below is a list of notable women's artistic gymnastics events scheduled to be held in 2017, as well as the medalists.

Calendar of events

International level

National level

International medalists

Major competitions

International championships

Continental championships

World Cup

Season's best international scores
Note: Only the scores of gymnasts from international events have been included below. Finalists at the 2017 World Championships are highlighted in green.

Seniors

All-around

Vault

Uneven bars

Balance beam

Floor exercise

Juniors

All-around

Vault

Uneven bars

Balance beam

Floor 

Artistic
Artistic gymnastics
Gymnastics by year